The Shagan (Shaǵan) is a river in the West Kazakhstan Region, Kazakhstan, and Orenburg Oblast, Russia.

It is  a tributary of the Ural.

Its name may be derived either from the Tatar word for "maple" or from the Kalmyk  for "white". Among the Kazakhs, the river is also known as "Aksu" "White Water".

See also
List of rivers of Kazakhstan

References 

Rivers of Kazakhstan
Rivers of Orenburg Oblast
Ural basin